The 2011 FC Kairat season was the club's 2nd season back in the Kazakhstan Premier League, the highest tier of association football in Kazakhstan, since their promotion back to the top flight in 2009. Kairat finished the season in 11th place and reached the Quarterfinal of the Kazakhstan Cup.

Squad

Transfers

Winter

In:

Out:

Summer

In:

Out:

Competitions

Kazakhstan Premier League

Regular season

Results summary

Results by round

Results

League table

Relegation Round

Results

Table

Kazakhstan Cup

Squad statistics

Appearances and goals

|-
|colspan="14"|Players away from Kairat on loan:
|-
|colspan="14"|Players who appeared for Kairat that left during the season:
|}

Goal scorers

Disciplinary record

References

External links
Official Site

Kairat
FC Kairat seasons